Vijaynagar (also known as Vijay Nagar and Vijoynagar) is the most remote town and circle headquarters in the Changlang district, Arunachal Pradesh, India.

According to the 2011 census, Vijaynagar has a population of 4,438.

Location 
It is bordered to the south and east by Myanmar, and to the north by a thick forest of the Namdapha National Park. Nearby Indian cities are Miao, Hayuliang, and Tezu. Putao is the nearest city in Myanmar.

History 
In a 1961-1962 expedition led by the Assam Rifles, Maj. Gen A.S Gauraya found an uninhabited zone of Indian territory between the three-sided border of Burma (Myanmar) and named the region Vijaynagar in honour of his son "Vijay." After the settlement process was initiated by the North East Frontier Agency (now known as Arunachal Pradesh), two hundred families of Assam Rifles soldiers (95% of whom are Gurkhas) settled there.

Today, Vijaynagar is a cluster of 12 villages on the border with Myanmar: Ramnagar, Chididi, Majgoan, Two-hut, Budhamandir, Phaparbari, Daragoan, Gehrigaon, Topi-Hill, Preeti Nagar, (Assam Rifle settlers) Hazolo, and Dawadi (Yobin inhabitants).

Transportation
Vijaynagar can only be reached on foot, or by air via the Vijaynagar Airport (also called the Vijaynagar Advanced Landing Ground). This is the 8th Advanced Landing Ground (ALG) in Arunachal Pradesh upgraded by the Indian Airforce (IAF) and Indian Army (IA) in September 2019 to allow the landing of fighter jets and large transport planes. The upgrade involved building local link roads among villages around Vijaynagar.

A road connection to nearby Miao, costing ₹225 crores, was dedicated in February 2013 but has been delayed by environmental activists concerned about the National Park. The issue was resolved by adding a prefabricated bridge to protect park life and facilitate monitoring by the Forests Department. In September 2019, the Governor of Arunachal Pradesh ordered new construction by first completing the central bridge road, already being built in Kolkata. There are plans to extend this road to Putao Airport in Myanmar under the Look East policy, thus connecting it to both India's and Myanmar's national highway networks.

Vijaynagar would be the eastern terminus of the Arunachal Pradesh Frontier Highway, a proposed  road following the McMahon Line to Mago and Thingbu in the west. A map of the proposed route can be seen here and here.

See also

 North-East Frontier Agency
 List of people from Arunachal Pradesh
 Religion in Arunachal Pradesh
 Arunachalese cuisine
 List of institutions of higher education in Arunachal Pradesh

References 

Changlang district